Emmanouil Emmanouilidis (1867–1943) was an Ottoman Greek representative for the Committee of Union and Progress during the Second Constitutional Era. He was born in 1867. He served at the Parliament from Izmir and was one of the deputies who criticized the press law of 1915. He died in 1943.

References

Greeks from the Ottoman Empire
Committee of Union and Progress politicians
1867 births
1943 deaths
People from Kayseri
Istanbul University Faculty of Law alumni
Deputies of Izmir